Baxter railway station is located on the Stony Point line in Victoria, Australia. It serves the town of Baxter, and it opened on 1 October 1888 as Mornington Junction. It was renamed Baxter on 6 May 1918.

History

Baxter station opened on 1 October 1888, when the railway line from Frankston was extended. It remained a terminus until 10 September 1889, when the line was extended to Hastings and Mornington. Like the town itself, the station was named after Captain Benjamin Baxter, who was the proprietor of the nearby Carrup Carrup pastoral run.

In 1972, flashing light signals were provided at the Baxter-Tooradin Road level crossing, located nearby in the Stony Point (Down) direction of the station.

Baxter was formerly the junction for the Mornington line, which was closed to traffic in 1981. The junction, which was relocated to its current location in 1962, can still be seen at the Down end of the station, though the points have been spiked and the line baulked just after the level crossing. In the near future, this junction will be restored by the extension of the Mornington Railway, a heritage railway organisation.

On 22 June 1981, the passenger service between Frankston and Stony Point was withdrawn and replaced with a bus service. On 16 September 1984, promotional trips for the reopening of the line began and, on 27 September of that year, the passenger service was reinstated.

By March 1989, the station operated under no-one in charge conditions.

In 2009, boom barriers were provided at the Baxter-Tooradin Road level crossing.

Langwarrin, a now demolished station on the Stony Point line, was located between Leawarra and Baxter.

Platforms and services

Baxter has one platform. It is serviced by Metro Trains' Stony Point line services.

Platform 1:
  all stations services to Frankston; all stations services to Stony Point

Transport links

Ventura Bus Lines operates one route via Baxter station, under contract to Public Transport Victoria:
 : Frankston station – Pearcedale

References

External links

 Melway map at street-directory.com.au

Railway stations in Melbourne
Railway stations in Australia opened in 1888
Railway stations in the Shire of Mornington Peninsula